Glenn Read (born: 7 April 1945) is a sailor from Australia. who represented his country at the 1988 Summer Olympics in Busan, South Korea as crew member in the Soling. With helmsman Bob Wilmot and fellow crew members Matthew Percy they took the 14th place.

References

Living people
1945 births
Sailors at the 1988 Summer Olympics – Soling
Olympic sailors of Australia
Australian male sailors (sport)
20th-century Australian people